The History of rugby league in South Africa goes back as far as the 1950s. The 1990s brought about the establishment of the South African Rugby Football League to promote amateur rugby league.

Failed promotion - 1950s

In 1953, a committee was formed, headed by Mr. Ludwig Japhet, for the sole purpose of promotion of rugby league. No doubt, the decision to form such a committee was the lure of potential sponsorship and gate takings that playing rugby league in new areas or against other nations would undoubtedly bring to the game. Mr. Ludwig Japhet held a meeting with Mr. Bill Fallowfield in December of that year to discuss the possibilities of rugby league promotion in which South Africa was discussed.

The labours of the promotional committee bore its fruit in South Africa in 1957 with the British and French teams staging a series of exhibition matches for the promotion of the game. Unfortunately neither the British nor the French took the games seriously, which resulted in light and effortless tackling; the lack of the biff and barge, which the South Africans where so accustom to, left them unsatisfied with what they had seen. After playing the two matches in Benoni and Durban a third was scheduled for East London, although this never did take place.

Another attempt - 1960s

The idea of rugby league in South Africa faded with the death of Mr. Ludwig Japhet after the experimental tour, only to be brought back to life with the formation of two almost indistinguishable but totally separate rugby league organisations: The National Rugby League (NRL), formed by one Mr. Norman Lacey and Rugby League South Africa (RLSA) instigated by a Mr Maurice Smith with the formation of a caretaker committee of which Messrs John B. Weill and Irwin Benson where involved and subsequently handed the responsibility of the fledgling organisation.

Both leagues saw themselves as the governing body of rugby league in South Africa and thus both had plans to commence competitions in the summer of 1962. Eventually both organisations came to be actively reporting to the British RFL, as well as receiving promotional material which fostered an intense rivalry between the two factions. Unfortunately for rugby league in South Africa, the two organisations could not settle their differences and each went a head with their respectful competitions; so was born rugby league in South Africa, under confusing and hostile circumstances.

In that year, both organisations sought touring teams from the UK. The National rugby league organised to have Wakefield Trinity compete against a combined XIII, however as the score lines told, this was perhaps too stiff for the South Africans to handle, losing 59–3. Rugby League South Africa attempted to counteract any of the difficulties its identical twin had in the face of stiff English competition and hired former Wigan, Easts and Australian coach, Dave Brown, for three months. The Lions defeated the South Africans rugby league representative side convincingly. Fortunately, not all was lost as the British later admitting that the South Africans where skilled, only lacking in tactics, specifically defensive, which had lost them the game.

1962

Imagination

Each organisation went on to make separate applications for affiliation with the International Board. The RLIF must have known that the decision to grant one league affiliation with the board would inevitably lead to the collapse of the other and thus such a move would result in loss of clubs and fans.

In an effort to protect the game in South Africa, the international board put forth a proposal to both parties that would effectively see the two league's merged. In reality, the RLIF gave the NRL its death notice, who had little choice but to turn over its clubs to the South African Rugby League as it seemed the RLIF now favoured the SARL over itself. To make the deal more appealing to the NRL, the international board also proposed that the NRL clubs founders be reimbursed for any initial investments through future NRL club profits in the SARL.

1963

The Beginning of the end

South African rugby league as it seemed, had a future. Part of this future, it was hoped, was that the nine teams located in the Johannesburg area would launch the 1963 season.

At the time when the International Board had made its proposal for the combined governing body for rugby league in South Africa it also stated the significance an invitation from Australia to the South Africans to tour. The Australian board of control also took on the International Boards proposal and in an obvious expression of their interest in seeing rugby league exceed in South Africa, offered the invitational side 65 percent of gross gates and a guaranteed $45,000.

As was a tradition already set down in South African rugby league history, only more could go wrong, and it did. The visitors where totally out-played by the Australian's, even taking into account the early injuries sustained by the South Africans. It was obvious the skill and their knowledge of tactics (particularly of the forwards) had not improved and so it set a deep decline for South African rugby league.

New beginnings – 1990s

In December 1988 when Widnes and Wigan were both at the top of the Rugby League tree in England, a chance meeting took place in the South African Irish pub called Fibber Maghees next to Kyalami Motor Racing circuit. Dave Southern from Widnes and Tony Barker from Wigan were the individuals the conversation went something like this DS to TB - I contacted Harry Edgar from Open Rugby about a World Development Officer who could help establish League in SA, he wrote back to say that no such position existed and even if it did SA would not be welcome due to the current political regime in power - Apartheid - basically I felt that I was being penalised for being in the country and trying to promote my game.

TB to DS so what did you do? Well I wrote a masterpiece to the RFL Chairman at Chappeltown Rd Mr David Oxley asking him if the time was not right now for the development of League in SA given the IRB sanction of a world 15 to play against the Springboks at Ellis Park - Mr Oxley replied "...sport and politics are inextricably mixed, and to ignore one without the other is simply to bury ones head in the sand..." So what are you going to do now Dave? Well not quite sure at the moment. TB-Why don't we do it ourselves? What? Start League in SA? DS-Yeah I'm up for that how should we start? TB-I'm actually going to the UK for a month when I'm back why don't we get together and talk?
(This sounded like a cooling off period for me DS to forget about the idea as far as I could tell) Tony gave me his tel number and I duly phoned him in Jan 89 as arranged. Tony needed to be prompted as to who I was and what we had agreed but we set a meeting up to discuss. I was playing RU for Old Edwardians (Old Eds) at the time in a suburb of Jhb called Houghton. My connections were good with the coaching staff and as luck would have it one of the coaches Gary Lewis had a brother in law called Ray Mordt the ex Wigan winger from the 80's.

We decided to place an advertisement in the Saturday Star looking for people interested in playing, officiating supporting or watching RL to call our two listed respective telephone numbers. The phone at my place of residence was running hot on the Sunday morning we collected in excess of 40 names of interested parties. A reporter called Rodney Hartman from the Star followed up on the advert and wrote a good article in the paper talking about our plans and desires for RL. He assisted us in advertising our meeting of interested persons at what was to become the inaugural meeting at Old Eds.

The meeting saw Dave Southern address the audience of some 60-100 people in a Martin Luther King sort of a way with his I have a dream vision for RL. Ray Mordt attended but was reluctant to nail his colours to the mast since he was unsure of what lay ahead of him perhaps (he went on to become coach of Gauteng Lions). The meeting was met with a positive response with Trevor Lake (Born in Rhodesia was set to play for the Junior Springboks, ex Wigan player) being on hand from the press appeal to add a mature and steady hand to the proceedings he didn't talk formally at the launch other than to say that he would be prepared to support us where he could."

After a series of training sessions and friendly games played amongst loose combinations of players at Old Eds and Jeppe Old Boys Rugby Club, The big breakthrough came when Trevor Lake introduced the group to Peter Cook the cricket enthusiast who was involved in the introduction of Kerry Packer style Day Night cricket to SA.  With Peter on board we soon had an Inaugural Luncheon arranged as a launching platform for the game and a fund-raiser at the same time.  Around the same time Ray Mordt introduce the original Committee which included Trevor Lake, Dave Southern, John Callaghan, Peter Cook and Trevor Lake to the Ex N.Transvaal and Pretoria Harlequins player Jacey Strauss.  Numerous meeting took place with Strauss and before too long he was brought onto the Board.

Club formation in the first year or two was left to Dave Southern who, as well as forming the original team Johannesburg Nomads (later to be known as the Warriors), also conducted coaching clinics at schools such as Witkoppen, Paradise Bend and Leukop Prison School all in the Northern suburbs of Johannesburg.  John Callaghan used his business contacts to get us into SAMCOR a motor car production company in Pretoria, from this base we would bring in children from the nearby Mamelodi township.  Progress was rapid and very encouraging with hundreds of children turning up on Saturday morning coaching clinics.

1992

The first championship

Until this point, the SARL board had only organised the odd friendlies and township clinics. That all changed when SARL organised an inner city championship, the first of its kind under the administrations control.

Jacey Strauss began to effectively run the league in 1992 and set about fundraising; at times utilising his offices (at ABI Coca-Cola bottlers in Midrand) efforts to get things done, which earned the board a new sponsor (Magnis Nissan a local Pretoria motor dealer) for the championship to be held in September.

Meanwhile, SARL had also made contact with a Melbourne-based entrepreneur Glenn Johnson who in turn, saw potential of Russia coming to South Africa for a test. Importantly, he brought to South Africa his cousin, Paul Matete, the ex-Kiwi international who soon become South African Rhino's coach. Paul Matete used the championship as a launch pad for his first ever-national team to play Russia that November.

Importantly the championship had attracted Mike Bardsley, an enthusiast who had access to videos, editing equipment and contacts at S.A.B.C, the state broadcaster. Bardsley videoed the championship and some township based coaching clinics and put together a good promotional package. S.A.B.C showed it and the response was good.

The championship was staged in Pretoria over two days and included teams from Pretoria, Cape Town, Durban, Johannesburg and Port Elizabeth. Durban beat Pretoria 8–6 in a very hard final.  Two notable guests from England were in attendance, Jim Mills and Sam Evans from Widnes, they were on a fact finding mission and very kindly brought over a gift of a set of Widnes shirts to help with the development plans.

Barry Haslam refereed seven open age games in 24 hours. It was this that led to further development of the league and South African rugby leagues first referee development program.

The first test series

Dave Southern's good work in the townships had given SARL useful political allies (NSC etc.) to get approval for the tour. Jacey Strauss found both SA and Russian based sponsors to pay for food, accommodation and matches. The Russian Bears arrived in November.

South Africa lost both their games, leaving it to a local Cape Town side to win back some South African pride. The aggregate crowd for the tour was in excess of 6000, which unfortunately was not enough to have the competition at least break even. Despite the debt, the good crowd figures and pleasing displays from both sides meant that the series had given SARL a small launch pad for the code in South Africa.

Meanwhile, the RFL was struggling to manage troubles that had arisen in Russian rugby league which led to the RFL to appoint the Australian Rugby League and Bob Abbott as minder of the SARL.

1993

The board splits

Turmoil hit South African rugby league again as two factions formed within the board when members became disgruntled over poor financial management, extravagance and naivete. Strauss and his entrepreneurs felt the organisation could recover and that the investments over the last year where needed to lift the profile of the game. The alternative faction, behind Lake, where concerned with ill-disciplined planning and aimed at more sustainable growth and thus felt resources should be invested in grassroots and particularly the townships.

In January 1993, nine board members, led by Barry Haslam called for Lake's resignation 'out of the blue'. It duly came and with him three other board members followed (Dave Southern, Tony Ellison and John Callaghan). Dave Southern's position was made impossible when he was given an ultimatum to concentrate his, up to now township work in white suburban areas in order to secure a stipend of a payment as a salary.  When he asked what the alternative was to the offer to work in white schools he was told that the alternative was that he wouldn't get paid - on being pushed for an answer and obvious acceptance of the terms presented, the Board were surprised when Southern said "I dont think Im going to get paid?".  This was the start of Mini League South Africa. The exchange of letters, threats, abuse and acrimony was unpleasant on both sides.

The high point

The period from 1993 to 1994 is supposed to have been an era of unprecedented growth and success of the game in South Africa attributed mostly to the South African televising of the ARL despite the claim that the weekly half-hour highlights package was used more as a filler than as a program designed to attract significant viewers. The televising ran uninterrupted for 18 months and attracted an average viewership of 1.2 million, no doubt an important advertisement for rugby league in South Africa.

In August, the league finances stabilised and Coca-Cola became major sponsor of a youth sevens tournament. The tournament ran with over 1,000 children, still a rugby league record for one festival. Meanwhile, Ian Parnaby and Haslam coached over 90 referees/teachers and ran clinics in the Cape townships for 500 children.

South Africa performed well enough at the World Sevens earlier in the year that the ARL saw fit to give their blessing for a tour to South Africa by Australian outfit North Sydney Bears; negotiated by Struass and Haslam. 

Following the Russian tests, the 1993/94 season included an all-time high of 26 clubs from Johannesburg, Cape Town, Natal and Mooi-Nooi. The league also consisted of four regional committees which began to prepare for the arrival of Barla. The number of clubs and regional committees represented a strength to the board, never before seen in South African rugby league.

1994
The SARL was riding a wave of success and profit from the 1993 season. The BARLA tour was well run, well attended and had good sponsorship. The Rhinos sharpened their own preparation with another good Sydney Sevens. The league was in the black, expanding and taking the game to new areas, such as Randfontein with the Transvaal and BARLA game, which it is reported attracted a crowd of 300.

Political change

The multi-racial elections of April 1994 precipitated changes to the country that caused League to rapidly lose ground over the next 18 months and since never regain its previous public support.

Global sport exploded; South Africa had legitimate international competition. Rugby Union, soccer, cricket, tennis, golf and athletics made large in-roads into South African psyche as sports people signed up deal after deal and world sport filled South African television screens; leaving little room for rugby league. Former sponsors of township development now diverted all their spare cash to government projects. The league was eventually forced off television as other sports with overseas sponsorship came in, such as swimming, basketball and baseball.

1995
Ockie Oosthuizen

Ocki Oosthuizen was a self-made and well known entrepreneur who had been hovering on the fringes of the league well before his arrival in mid-1994 when he was to professionally event manage the October series against Queensland, another tour attributable to Bob Abbott. The Rihnos where coached by Paul Matete and assisted by no less than Artie Beetson. The event ran in the red and the Rhinos where beaten 28–0. Suffering a substantial financial loss, Ockie promptly withdrew his financial support for the December tour by Perth's Western Reds, which went ahead anyway, although it was modestly run, staged and attended.

The South African Rugby League club season shrank on the back of SARLs looming financial crisis  and a lack of league being broadcast on South African television screens. However, Ockie had not been discouraged by the years misfortunes and arranged to have the ailing SARL office moved  to his insurance firm where a consultants developed a business plan for the launching of a professional league in South Africa. However, Ockie lost patience with the board, who were largely amateur club men, as opposed to Ockie who had come from an entrepreneurial life.

Ockie's attitude hardened the moment Super League exploded onto the scene. He was above board about his views, which largely excluded grassroots development, and frantically pursued Super League in with his plans in Leeds and Sydney. But the clubs fought back, undermining Oosthuizen's ambitions and fuelling suspicions and global politics that held back the previous international board.

World Cup

By July 1995, three months before the Centenary World Cup, Ockie Oosthuizen had serious reservations about the likelihood of a deal with Super League.

Tony Fisher arrived to prepare the Rhinos for the World Cup and he and Ootsthuizen - both abrasive- quickly fell out. The Rhinos, a collection of largely club players, trained daily for 15 weeks and confidently beat BARLA in two tests. Oosthuizen was footing the bill and a last-ditch visit by Roy Waudby did not engender Ockie or the British Rugby League to either.

The Halifax World Cup saw the Rhinos easily beaten in their three games.

The court case against the Australian Super League and Ockie's fallout with the British Rugby League (Maurice Lindsay) ended his involvement with SARL.

1996
SARL steadily became more unstable as Ockie disassociated himself with the board and their membership of the RLIF was suspended. As the Super League and ARL civil war continued in Australia, consuming large sums of money that otherwise would have been used for international development, South Africa was left abandoned like many start up leagues of the time.

The South African Rugby League came close to total collapse; the board however regrouped and contact resumed with the RFL. Following the regrouping, the board held a fully democratic annual general meeting. Contact resumed with the RFL, through Maurice Lindsay who supported SARLs ambitions to enter the 1996 student world cup, which SARL had planned to use as a vehicle for reestablishing the ailing SARL and its clubs to its former more stable self. SARL went on to win the bowl-final as opposed to the cup final of the student world cup; a semi-good result.

Through some intense lobbying by SARL and constant support from the RFL's Maurice Lindsay, South Africa was further awarded the Student World Cup for 1998.

Further to SARL's rebuilding effort, Barry Haslam accepted an invitation to the international board meeting in Auckland of that year. Haslam gave his presentation and proposal for SARL to be invited back as a member of the RLIF. Maurice Lindsay subsequently announced that by a unanimous vote, SARL had been welcomed back to the RLIF.

1997
SARL put together a nines side, coached by ex Springbok Tiaan Strauss and supplemented by South African players that had been strengthened through scholarships to Australian Super League clubs. The SARL nines beat France, Japan, the Cook Islands, drew to Tonga and lost to GB and Fiji. The Australian Press labelled the SARL nines side as 'the surprise package' of the tournament and dramatically improved.

Bill Baguley, Chairman of Germiston and board member, pioneered the "Athlone" model. SARL's efforts in the black townships over the years have largely failed due to little infrastructure and support. Schools, however have been encouraging since parents and teachers are great resources and your still establishing the game at a grass roots level. Athlone had developed into an established league playing school, of whom most of its students were black. Athlone went on to regularly play and beat white teams without; one of the few sustained achievements of the 1990s SARL board.
The team that left South African shores to tour Australia were studded with ex-Springbok, union players. Some  of the Union stars of the 60's, played Rugby League but did not adapt fast enough to challenge any rugby team on their  tour to Australia. There they suffered two defeats but very little was said about this team which learned by their mistakes. to score a narrow win of 7–4 in the land of the White Cloud! The team was known as the "Springbok Rugby League side", the first and very last to wear a Springbok on their  blazers. Back biome, the South Africans faced the unforeseen!  Virtually all the municipalities were instructed not to make plying fields available to Rugby League in South Africa. Players were scorned as "Traitors" and were out cast for selling their first birth right, namely union or amateur rugby. The game that was loved by dedicated rugby stars was a dying one. But the fighting spirit of
a young rugby player (Jan Prinsloo, also called "Jan Das", from Pretoria Rugby League Club, took up the gloves with the South African Rugby Board and in particular with the President of the Union, Dr. Danie Craven.  Dr. Danie who had sympathy with League said that although he had tried to have the  league players  reinstated, there was nothing he could do as it was in the hands of the International Rugby Board. Those letters and correspondence is available and in the position of Prinsloo who said that rugby league will one day become a giant amongst  rugby codes in the world and until then he will not rest to see this happened. The battle went on for some time and many others tried to revive the sport. The sand was running out and many of the  players became disillusioned. The years went by. In the background stood the very same young man. Prinsloo, who has now become an old man, always wearing his Springbok Rugby League blazer. After 60 years of dedicated service to League, he was heralded as a Legend in South Africa's League Hall of fame and was bestowed for a second time the honor as a Legend when he received Rugby League's Highest accolade the Rhino Blaser, the only Rugby League player to be awarded double Legend status. What happened is history and a chapter that needs not to be forgotten or ignored or scraped. The history of the game forms the backbone of Rugby League in South Africa.

References

 South Africa RL History
 More SA RL History

Rugby league in South Africa
South Africa